Nowruzabad (also Romanized as Nowrūzābād) is a village in Chaypareh-ye Pain Rural District, Zanjanrud District, Zanjan County, Zanjan Province, Iran. At the 2006 census, its population was 72, in 16 families.

References 

Populated places in Zanjan County